The Bishop of Gippsland is the diocesan bishop of the Anglican Diocese of Gippsland, Australia.

List of Bishops of Gippsland
References

External links

 – official site

 
Lists of Anglican bishops and archbishops
Anglican bishops of Gippsland